Edson Seidou (born 6 October 1991) is a French professional footballer who plays as a defender for  club Laval.

Career
Seidou was trained at Niort, and spent his early career at the third and fourth level of French football with Amiens SC, AC Amiens, Roye-Noyon, Colomiers, Red Star and Épinal. He made his breakthrough at the professional level in June 2016 when he joined Orléans in Ligue 2, signing an initial one-year contract, with the option of an additional year should Orléans remain in Ligue 2.

He made his Ligue 2 debut for Orléans in the first game of the 2016–17 Ligue 2 season, coming on as a late substitute in a 1–0 defeat against Le Havre.

After two season and 50 Ligue 2 appearances for Orléans, Seidou left upon expiration of his contract and, on 30 May 2018, signed with former club Red Star.

After a lack of playing time Seidou left Red Star in June 2020, and signed a two-year deal with Laval, reuniting with Olivier Frapolli who had coached him in Ligue 2 with Orléans.

Personal life 
Born in France, Seidou is of Ivorian descent.

Honours 
Laval

 Championnat National: 2021–22

References

1991 births
Living people
Association football defenders
French footballers
Ivorian footballers
French sportspeople of Ivorian descent
Ligue 2 players
Championnat National players
Championnat National 3 players
Amiens SC players
AC Amiens players
US Colomiers Football players
Red Star F.C. players
SAS Épinal players
US Orléans players
Stade Lavallois players